This is a list of Swiss football transfers for the 2018–19 winter transfer window by club. Only transfers of clubs in the Swiss Super League are included.

Swiss Super League

Note: Flags indicate national team as has been defined under FIFA eligibility rules. Players may hold more than one non-FIFA nationality.

Basel

In:

Out:

Grasshoppers

In:

Out:

Lugano

In:

Out:

Luzern

In:

Out:

Neuchâtel Xamax

In:

Out:

Sion

In:

Out:

St. Gallen

In:

Out:

Thun

In:

Out:

Young Boys

In:

Out:

Zürich

In:

Out:

References

External links
 Official site of the SFV
 Official site of the Swiss Football League

Switzerland
Transfers
2018–19